CGS Canada was a patrol vessel, sometimes referred to as a cruiser, in the Fisheries Protection Service of Canada, an enforcement agency that was part of the Department of Marine and Fisheries. Canada is considered to be the nucleus of the Royal Canadian Navy for her role in training Canadian naval officers and asserting Canadian sovereignty. Canada saw service in the First World War and was commissioned into the Royal Canadian Navy as HMCS Canada during that conflict. Following the war, the vessel was sold for commercial use and renamed MV Queen of Nassau. On the verge of being sold again, the ship sank in Straits of Florida on 2 July 1926.

Description
Canada had a ram bow. The ship could carry  of coal for fuel. The ship was initially fitted with four 3-pounder guns. For naval service, the ship was rearmed with two 12-pounder and two 3-pounder guns. Canada was fitted with a Marconi wireless, a device just being installed aboard much larger British warships at the time.

Service history

Civilian service
As part of Prime Minister Sir Wilfrid Laurier's efforts to relieve Great Britain's overall commitment to North American defence in the wake of the Boer War, the Laurier government sought to develop the Fisheries Protection Service. As part of this effort, the government ordered a patrol ship in 1903–1904 for service on the East Coast of Canada. Canada was laid down by Vickers, Sons & Maxim at their shipyard in Barrow-in-Furness, England and launched on 15 June 1904. The ship was completed in July that year. Canada arrived at Quebec City on 29 September after undergoing a two-week inspection at Gaspé, Quebec. The ship then sailed for Halifax, Nova Scotia to install the Marconi wireless and more sea trials. 

In January 1905, with naval militia recruits aboard, the ship was sent to the Caribbean Sea to join Royal Navy naval exercises there. Canadas participation in Royal Navy fleet exercises in 1905 is considered by some to be the beginnings of Canada's naval activity. The patrol vessel's planned Caribbean cruise in 1907 was cancelled due to personnel requirements. In 1908, the Canadian government sought to build a naval militia around Canada. This was soon put off as the department came under investigation.</ref> That year Canada took part in Quebec City's tercentenary celebrations.

In 1908, Canada became a training ship for officer cadets for the planned Canadian navy. Thus CGS Canada became Canada's first naval training ship and was, as stated by naval historians in Canada, the "Flagship of the embryonic Canadian Navy at the time, symbolic of the evolution of Canada from a dominion within the British Empire to a sovereign nation." In 1909, the Fisheries crew was removed from the ship and volunteers from the Royal Navy Reserve were brought aboard to provide a higher level of naval training. However, Canada continued to be used as a fisheries patrol vessel. In 1910, the Canadian navy was formed Canada escorted one of the nation's newly acquired cruisers, into Halifax Harbour, with the new navy's cadets and the Director of the Naval Service, Rear Admiral Charles Kingsmill, aboard.

HMCS Canada

After the First World War broke out in August 1914, Canada was transferred to the Royal Canadian Navy on 4 August. The ship then underwent a refit that rearmed her with more powerful weaponry and raised Canadas forecastle. The ship was commissioned as HMCS Canada on 25 January 1915 and served on the Atlantic coast as an anti-submarine patrol vessel. In June 1915, Canada escorted four H-class submarines from Quebec City to Newfoundland. However, both ships needed long refits afterwards and did not return to service until September. By 1917, Canadas boilers were worn out and needed replacement. On 6 December 1917 she was one of the ships anchored at HMC Dockyard in Halifax Harbour during the Halifax Explosion. She suffered minor damage and one crew member was seriously injured. In 1918, Canada was among the Canadian naval vessels used to escort convoys from Quebec City through the Gulf of St. Lawrence. Following the end of the war, HMCS Canada was decommissioned in November 1919.

Queen of Nassau
In 1920, Canada was offered for sale at a price of $25,000. When no one purchased her, she was laid-up in Halifax. In 1921, Canada was offered to the Navy League of Canada for free, but the Navy League could not afford the insurance and other costs associated with the ship, and the offer was declined. After four years of neglect she was sold to Florida Inter Islands Steam Ship Company and then re-sold to Florida real estate entrepreneur Barron Gift Collier Sr. The ship was renamed  Queen of Nassau and pressed into service passenger service between Miami, Florida and Nassau, Bahamas. This was a service for which she was poorly equipped, lacking comfortable overnight accommodations for the island cruise, as well as air conditioning. Passengers rapidly lost interest in the service and once again the ship sat idle and rusting, this time for 18 months in Biscayne Bay.

Collier announced some Mexican investors were interested in purchasing the ship for service in the Gulf of Mexico in June 1926. The ship left Miami in ballast on 30 June 1926 for Tampa, Florida to undergo a final inspection before the sale. After stopping twice in the Straits of Florida due to problems with her boilers, she began taking on water on 2 July 1926. At first her three pumps were enough to keep her afloat but when flooding reached her engine room, the boilers cooled and then failed, leaving no power for the pumps.

Wreck site
In March 2003, the site was the focus of an archaeological investigation by a NOAA team consisting of the Monitor National Marine Sanctuary, East Carolina University, National Undersea Research Center (NURC) at the University of North Carolina at Wilmington and videographer Rick Allen and Kimberly Faulk from Nautilus Productions. Nautilus Productions provided site documentation, documented the archaeological survey and recorded diving activities during the dives. The wreck is encrusted with oysters, as well as sponges, corals, and other invertebrate growth and rests upright on a white, sandy bottom.

Archaeologists are working toward designating the wreck a U.S. National Historic Site because of the significance it holds in the evolution of Canada's military.

Notes

Citations

Bibliography

External links
 Converted civilian vessels
 Queen of Nassau at wrecksite.eu

Patrol vessels of the Canadian Coast Guard
Patrol vessels of the Royal Canadian Navy
1904 ships
Ships built in Barrow-in-Furness
Maritime incidents in 1926
Shipwrecks of the Florida Keys
Underwater archaeological sites
Auxiliary ships of the Royal Canadian Navy
World War I naval ships of Canada